Siderostigma is a genus of moth in the family Lecithoceridae.

Species
 Siderostigma symbolica Gozmány, 1973
 Siderostigma triatoma Gozmány, 1978

References

Natural History Museum Lepidoptera genus database

Lecithocerinae
Moth genera